The canton of Manosque-1 (before March 2015: Manosque-Sud-Ouest) is an administrative division in southeastern France. It consists of the western part of the commune of Manosque and its western suburbs. It includes the following communes:
Manosque (partly)
Montfuron
Pierrevert

Demographics

See also
Cantons of the Alpes-de-Haute-Provence department

References

Cantons of Alpes-de-Haute-Provence